Castelo de Celorico da Beira is a castle in Portugal. It is classified as a National Monument.

Celorico Beira
National monuments in Guarda District
Celorico Beira